Tritonia (flame freesia) is a genus of flowering plants in the iris family first described as a genus in 1802. They are naturally distributed across southern Africa, with a high concentration of species in Cape Province of western South Africa. The genus is closely related to the genus Ixia.

Tritonia are small bulbous plants up to 80 cm, that appear in great numbers in spring. The leaves are fan-shaped. The flowers are shades of yellow, orange or brown, sweet-smelling, and give off a very strong fragrance, especially at night. They are not grazed.

The genus name is derived from the Latin word triton, meaning "weathervane", and alludes to the apparently random arrangement of the stamens in some species.

Cultivation 
Hardiness: Zones 8–11

 Species
 Tritonia atrorubens L.Bolus - Cape Province 
 Tritonia bakeri Klatt - Cape Province 
 Tritonia cedarmontana Goldblatt & J.C.Manning - Cedarberg in Cape Province 
 Tritonia chrysantha Fourc. - Cape Province 
 Tritonia cooperi (Baker) Klatt - Cape Province 
 Tritonia crocata (L.) Ker Gawl. - Cape Province 
 Tritonia delpierrei M.P.de Vos - Cape Province 
 Tritonia deusta  (Aiton) Ker Gawl. - Cape Province 
 Tritonia disticha  (Klatt) Baker - South Africa, Eswatini
 Tritonia drakensbergensis M.P.de Vos - Cape Province 
 Tritonia dubia Eckl. ex Klatt - Cape Province 
 Tritonia flabellifolia (D.Delaroche) G.J.Lewis - Cape Province 
 Tritonia florentiae  (Marloth) Goldblatt - Cape Province 
 Tritonia gladiolaris (Lam.) Goldblatt & J.C.Manning - South Africa, Lesotho; naturalized in Australia 
 Tritonia kamisbergensis Klatt - Cape Province 
 Tritonia karooica M.P.de Vos - Cape Province 
 Tritonia lancea (Thunb.) N.E.Br. - Cape Province  
 Tritonia laxifolia (Klatt) Baker - South Africa, Zambia, Malawi, Tanzania 
 Tritonia linearifolia Goldblatt & J.C.Manning - Cape Province  
 Tritonia marlothii M.P.de Vos - Cape Province  
 Tritonia moggii Oberm. - Mozambique 
 Tritonia nelsonii Baker - Botswana, Northern Province of South Africa 
 Tritonia pallida Ker Gawl. - Cape Province  
 Tritonia parvula N.E.Br. - Cape Province  
 Tritonia securigera  (Aiton) Ker Gawl. - Cape Province  
 Tritonia squalida (Aiton) Ker Gawl. - Cape Province; naturalized in Australia 
 Tritonia tugwelliae L.Bolus - Cape Province  
 Tritonia undulata (Burm.f.) Baker - Cape Province

References

External links
 Royal Botanic Gardens, Kew: World Checklist Series

Iridaceae genera
Iridaceae